Poon Pak On (Chinese: 潘栢安; born 24 June 1999 in Hong Kong) is a former Hong Kong professional footballer who played as a left back.

Club career

Dreams FC
Poon started his senior career with Dreams FC in 2017.

Rangers
In the 2019–20 season, Poon signed for Rangers, where he made 4 league appearances.

References

External links
HKFA

1999 births
Living people
Hong Kong people
Hong Kong footballers
Hong Kong Premier League players
Dreams Sports Club players
Hong Kong Rangers FC players
Association football defenders